Evgeny Andreyevich Tishchenko (born 15 July 1991) is a Russian professional boxer. As an amateur he won gold medals at the 2016 Olympics, 2015 World Championships, and the 2015 and 2017 European Championships and silver at the 2013 and 2017 World Championships.

Amateur career
Tishchenko was born in the village of Kanevskaya, Krasnodar Krai, but later moved to Belgorod. He is trained under the sports school of Ivan Levichev. Tishchenko became a member of the Russian national team in 2009.

He began competing among seniors in 2010 and twice won bronze medals at the Russian championships, losing the semifinals to Egor Mekhontsev in 2010 and to Nikita Ivanov in 2011. In addition, he took gold in the Youth European Championships U23 in Kaliningrad. In 2012, Tishchenko became the Russian National champion in heavyweight category. A year later, he would win the gold medal at the 2013 Summer Universiade. He won silver medal at the 2013 World Championships in Almaty, losing in the finals to twice Olympic silver medalist, Italian Clemente Russo.

In 2014, Tishchenko again won the Russian National championships, beating in finals; then European champion Aleksei Yegorov. He competed at the 2015 European Championships in Samokov, Bulgaria taking gold in heavyweight category. In October, he would repeat his success; winning the gold at the 2015 World Championships in Doha, Qatar, defeating Erislandy Savón of Cuba in the finals.

In the 2016 Olympics he again won a gold medal after defeating Kazakhstan's Vasily Levit on a controversial unanimous decision in the final. The final and medal ceremony saw angry crowd reactions.

Professional boxing career
Tischenko made his professional debut against Williams Ocando on 19 August 2018. He won the fight by a fifth-round technical knockout. Tischenko next faced Artush Sarkisyan on 13 October 2018. He won the fight by unanimous decision, with all three judges scoring the fight 60–54 in his favor. A month and a half later, on 24 November 2018, Tischenko faced Christian Mariscal. He won the fight by a second-round technical knockout, stopping Mariscal at the midway point of the round. Tischenko faced Jose Gregorio Ulrich in his fourth professional bout, which was scheduled for 22 February 2019. He won the fight by unanimous decision, with all three judges scoring the fight 80–72 for him.

Tischenko was booked to face the 16–1–1 Abraham Tabul for the vacant WBO Inter-Continental cruiserweight title on 16 June 2019. The fight was scheduled for the undercard of the Dmitry Kudryashov and Ilunga Makabu cruiserweight bout, and was broadcast by Match TV. Tischenko made quick work of his opponent, as he won the fight by a first-round knockout. Tischenko made his first WBO Inter-Continental title defense against Issa Akberbayev on 2 November 2019. Akberbayev retired from the bout at the end of the sixth round.

Tischenko faced John McCallum for the vacant WBO European cruiserweight title on 7 November 2020, on the undercard of the Magomed Kurbanov and Dmitry Mikhaylenko super welterweight bout. He won the fight by a second-round knockout, stopping McCallum with a left hook to he body. Tischenko next challenged the WBC Silver cruiserweight champion Thabiso Mchunu on 27 March 2021, in a bout which was both for the title and a WBC cruiserweight title eliminator. He lost the fight by unanimous decision, with scores of 117-111, 117-111 and 119-109.

Tischenko was scheduled to challenge the reigning  WBA (Regular) cruiserweight champion Ryad Merhy on 26 March 2022, at the RCC Boxing Academy in Yekaterinburg, Russia. The WBA withdrew its sanctioning of the fight, and does not recognize Tishchenko in its current ranking.

Personal life
Tishchenko has a degree in physical education from Belgorod State University. He has also studied at the Belgorod Technological University and Moscow State Mining University. He works as a police officer in Saint Petersburg. He was awarded a medal by the government after the Olympics.

Professional boxing record

References

External links

 
 
 
 
 
 Evgeniy Tishchenko at World Series of Boxing
 Evgeniy Tishchenko at The-Sports.org

1991 births
Living people
Heavyweight boxers
World boxing champions
Russian male boxers
People from Kanevskoy District
AIBA World Boxing Championships medalists
Olympic boxers of Russia
Boxers at the 2016 Summer Olympics
Medalists at the 2016 Summer Olympics
Olympic medalists in boxing
Olympic gold medalists for Russia
Universiade medalists in boxing
Universiade gold medalists for Russia
Medalists at the 2013 Summer Universiade
Sportspeople from Krasnodar Krai
Moscow State Mining University alumni